Pterolophia yunnanensis is a species of beetle in the family Cerambycidae. It was described by Stephan von Breuning in 1974. It is known from China.

References

yunnanensis
Beetles described in 1974